Eryx is a genus of nonvenomous snakes, commonly known as Old World sand boas, in the subfamily Erycinae of the family Boidae. Species of the genus are found in southeastern Europe, northern Africa, the Middle East, and southwestern Asia. Thirteen species are recognized as being valid.

Description
The genus Eryx has the following characters. The head is not distinct from the neck. The dorsal surface of the head is covered with small scales. The rostral is large. The eyes range from small to very small, and the pupils are vertical. The anterior maxillary teeth and anterior mandibular teeth are longer than the posterior ones. The body is almost cylindrical. The dorsal scales are smooth or keeled. The tail is very short, either not prehensile or only slightly prehensile. The subcaudals are undivided.

Distribution and habitat
Species of snakes of the genus Eryx are found in southeastern Europe, northern Africa, the Middle East, and southwestern Asia.

Species

Nota bene: In the list below, a taxon author in parentheses indicates that the species was originally described in a genus other than Eryx.

) Not including the nominate subspecies.
T) Type species.

Taxonomy
A new species, Eryx borrii, found in Somalia, was described by Lanza and Nistri (2005). The specific name borrii is in honor of Italian zoologist Marco Borri.

References

Further reading
Daudin FM (1803). Histoire Naturelle, Génerale et Particulière des Reptiles; Ouvrage faisant suite aux Œuvres de Leclerc de Buffon, et partie du Cours complet d'Histoire naturelle rédigé par C.S. Sonnini, membre de plusieurs Sociétés savantes. Tome septième [Volume 7]. Paris: F. Dufart. 436 pp. (Eryx, new genus, pp. 251–253). (in French).

External links

 
Snake genera
Taxa named by François Marie Daudin